The British Rail Class 84 was a 25 kV AC electric locomotive that operated on the West Coast Main Line (WCML) of the London Midland Region.

The ten strong class was one of five prototype classes of electric locomotives built in the early stages of WCML electrification. Built between 1960 and 1961, the type was not a success, as they were beset by technical problems, and after several lengthy periods of storage, and unsuccessful attempts at resolving these problems, British Rail decided to withdraw the entire fleet between 1977 and 1980.

History 
As part of the modernisation of the West Coast Main Line, which included electrification, 100 locomotives of five types were acquired from different manufacturers. Ten Class AL4 locomotives numbered E3036 - E3045 were built in 1960 by the North British Locomotive Company in Springburn, Glasgow, to a design by GEC.

Locomotive E3040 worked the inaugural AC electric-hauled train from Manchester Piccadilly to Crewe on 12 September 1960.

Power supply 
The locomotives always worked on power provided by overhead catenary energised at 25,000 V AC. However, the main transformer, normally operated with the four windings in series, could be operated at 6250V AC with the transformer windings in parallel. This voltage was initially to be used where limited clearances gave concern over use of the higher voltage. Since the clearances were found to be adequate, the lower voltage connections were locked out of use.

Service 

Once in service a number of problems emerged with the class, including rough riding, flashovers in the transformer windings, short lifespans for the motor spring drives, and major problems with the mercury-arc rectifiers. In April 1963 the entire fleet was temporarily taken out of service, and was returned to GEC Dukinfield, the builder of the electrical equipment, in an attempt to find a solution, and remedial work was carried out.

When the class returned to service, the problems persisted, and in 1967 they were placed into storage, using the former steam shed at Bury, along with Class AL3. During this time E3043 went to Rugby Testing Centre for trials.

Reprieve and rebuilding

The persistent problems could have been the end of the ten locomotives of Class 84, but the extension of the West Coast Main Line electrification to Glasgow meant that more electric locomotives would be needed. It was therefore decided that the stored Class AL3 and AL4 locomotives would be repaired, and returned to service which was conducted at Doncaster.

After spending five years in storage, all ten locomotives were rebuilt with silicon rectifiers and dual brakes in 1972. and were reclassified under TOPS as Class 84, being renumbered 84001 - 84010.

Withdrawal 

The second rebuild overcame some of the previous problems, however new problems emerged involving traction motor failures, caused in part by the long period they had spent in storage, and the class continued to give trouble in service. By the mid-1970s, having already spent a substantial amount of money on them, British Rail could not justify any further investment in the fleet, especially since the recently introduced Class 87s allowed them to be sidelined. The decision was taken to withdraw them from service, with 84005 and 84007 being the first to be withdrawn in April 1977, the last to be withdrawn were 84003 and 84010 in 1980.

After withdrawal 

Several of the locomotives were saved from scrap: 84001 was donated to the National Railway Museum for preservation. 84002 and 84010 were returned to GEC for a proposed scheme to use them as new-technology test bed locomotives, however this project never materialised, and both were scrapped in December 1982.

84009 saw further use in a new guise; it passed to the British Rail Research Division, and was rebuilt as an unpowered mobile load bank tester, to test the power supply to new and upgraded overhead line equipment, and was renumbered as ADB968021. In 1992 it was withdrawn from service and broken up. 84003, was saved to be used as a source of spares for 84009 and for possible conversion to departmental use, but was scrapped in 1986.

Preservation 
It was later on loan to the Scottish Railway Museum, Bo'ness.

Fleet details

References

Sources

Further reading

External links 

 "The AC Locomotive Group (caring for Class 84 84001)"

84
Bo-Bo locomotives
25 kV AC locomotives
NBL locomotives
Railway locomotives introduced in 1960
Standard gauge locomotives of Great Britain